Pitz is a surname. Notable people with the surname include:

 Herman Pitz (1865–1924), Major League Baseball player
 Henry Clarence Pitz (1895–1976), US-American artist, illustrator, editor, author, and teacher

See also

 Mesoamerican ballgame, known in Classical Maya as pitz
 19182 Pitz, main-belt asteroid
 PITZ, Photo Injector Test Facility
 
 Pfitz (disambiguation)